Look Out may refer to:

Look Out! (Stanley Turrentine album), 1960 
Look Out! (Johnny "Hammond" Smith album), 1962
Look Out – Phineas Is Back!, 1978 album by Phineas Newborn Jr.
Look Out! (20/20 album), 1981 album by 20/20
"Look Out!" (song), 2018 song by Rusko
"Look Out (Here Comes Tomorrow)", 1967 song on the Monkees album, More of the Monkees

See also
Lookout (disambiguation)